Elżbieta Drużbacka  (née Kowalska, 1695 or 1698 – March 14, 1765 in Tarnów) was a Polish poet of the late Baroque period.

Much of her work deals with the beauty of nature; her best known work is Description of the Four Seasons (Opisanie czterech części roku).

After her death, bishop Józef Andrzej Załuski collected her opus in the volume Zbiór rytmów polskich.

External links
Four seasons, fragment (Polish)

References

1690s births
1765 deaths
18th-century Polish–Lithuanian poets
18th-century Polish–Lithuanian women writers
Year of birth uncertain
Polish women poets
Baroque writers